Inge Simonsen (born 1 July 1953) is a Norwegian distance runner who tied for first place in the inaugural 1981 London Marathon. In that race, he and the other winner, American Dick Beardsley, intentionally crossed the finish line, in 2:11:48, holding hands in a dead heat. According to Beardsley, "It was a big deal for both of us because neither one of us had won a marathon before."

Achievements
All results regarding marathon, unless stated otherwise

References

External links 
 

1953 births
Living people
Norwegian male long-distance runners
Norwegian male marathon runners
London Marathon male winners